Marooning is the intentional act of abandoning someone in an uninhabited area, such as a desert island, or more generally (usually in passive voice) to be marooned is to be in a place from which one cannot escape. The word is attested in 1699, and is derived from the term maroon, a word for a fugitive slave, which could be a corruption of Spanish cimarrón (rendered as "symeron" in 16th–17th century English), meaning a household animal (or slave) who has "run wild".

The practice was a penalty for crewmen, or for captains at the hands of a crew in cases of mutiny. Generally, a marooned man was set on a deserted island, often no more than a sand bar at low tide. He would be given some food, a container of water, and a loaded pistol so he could die by suicide if he desired. The outcome of marooning was usually fatal, but William Greenaway and some men loyal to him survived being marooned, as did pirate captain Edward England.

The chief practitioners of marooning were 17th and 18th century pirates, to such a degree that they were frequently referred to as "marooners". The pirate articles of captains Bartholomew Roberts and John Phillips specify marooning as a punishment for cheating one's fellow pirates or other offences. In this context, to be marooned is euphemistically to be "made governor of an island".

During the late-18th century in the US South, "marooning" took on a humorous additional meaning describing an extended camping-out picnic over a period of several days.

Famous maroonings 

 1520: Juan de Cartagena and Pedro Sánchez de la Reina
 1520s: Pedro Serrano, marooned by shipwreck, a possible source for the novel Robinson Crusoe
 1542: Marguerite de La Rocque, rescued in 1544 (two others died)
 1629: Wouter Loos and Jan Pelgrom de Bye, from Batavia (1628 ship)
 1704: Alexander Selkirk, rescued in 1709,  another source for Robinson Crusoe
 1725: Leendert Hasenbosch, a Dutch sailor, was marooned on the deserted Ascension Island in 1725 as a punishment for sodomy. He is believed to have died there of thirst later that year. In 1726 his tent and diary were discovered by passing British sailors, and his diary was later translated and published in London.
 1807: Robert Jeffrey, rescued eight days later. Captain Warwick Lake of Recruit marooned an impressed seaman, Robert Jeffrey, on Sombrero island  on 13 December 1807. Eight days later, a passing American vessel, the schooner Adams from Marblehead, Massachusetts, rescued him. A court-martial later dismissed Lake from the Royal Navy.

In literature

The most famous literary reference to marooning probably occurs in Robert Louis Stevenson's Treasure Island in which Ben Gunn is left marooned on the island for three years.

A famous real-life marooning, initially at Selkirk's request, was leaving the sailor Alexander Selkirk on Juan Fernández Island off the coast of Chile, in the Pacific Ocean. Selkirk, a sailor with the Dampier expedition, was worried about the unseaworthy condition of his ship, the Cinque Ports, and had argued with the captain until he left him ashore on the island where they had briefly stopped for water and food supplies. The Cinque Ports indeed later sank with the loss of most of her crew. Selkirk was not rescued until four years later, by Woodes Rogers. Selkirk's travails provided part of the inspiration for Daniel Defoe's novel Robinson Crusoe. Today there are islands off the Chilean coast named Alejandro Selkirk Island and Robinson Crusoe Island.

In television
In 2012, Ed Stafford marooned himself on an uninhabited island off Fiji as an experiment for 60 days. He took with him no food, water, or survival equipment of any kind. What he did take were cameras to film the ordeal for Discovery Channel. Stafford completed the task and documents the psychological repercussions in his book Naked and Marooned.

See also
 Castaway
 Exile
 Ostracism
 Walking the plank

References

 

Execution methods
Pirate customs and traditions
Mutinies
Castaways